Orshi Drozdik (born 1946 in Hungary) is a feminist visual artist based in New York City. Her work consists of drawings, paintings, photographs, etchings, performances, videos, sculptures, installations, academic writings and fiction, that explore connected themes, sometimes over an extended period. Through her work, organized into several topics, she explores themes that undermine the traditional and erotic representation of women: Individual Mythologies, Adventure in Tecnos Dystopium, and Manufacturing the Self. She is influenced by Valéria Dienes, János Zsilka, Susan Sontag, Ludwig Wittgenstein, Luce Irigaray, Walter Benjamin, and Michel Foucault, among others. Her working method: critical analysis of meaning, influenced her contemporaries, her students and later generations of women artists. The art historian László Beke noted in an interview realized by Kata Krasznahorkai in 2017 that “Orsolya Drozdik (Orshi Drozdik) is the first feminist artist in Hungary”.

Biography

Early life
Drozdik grew up in Abda and Győr in Hungary. Her mother with her family were living in Pozsony (today Bratislava) until the end of second WW, in 1945 they were stripped of their property and citizenship by the Beneš decrees without compensation and forced to relocate. The government labeled her father, as most middle class intellectuals, class enemy and his property was confiscated. In 1956, after her father's death, she decided to be an artist. With the support of her mother (who alone raised Orshi, a sister Ildikó and a brother Béla), she started to learn formal drawing and painting in an evening drawing study group. Drozdik studied art at the Hungarian University of Fine Arts (1970-1977), in Budapest. She holds an MFA 1977 and PhD in Liberal Arts 2003.

1970–79

Starting in the 1970s and disregarding the patriarchal representation of the female body, she focused on the female point of view; she performed and made art in Budapest at the same time as Marina Abramović in Belgrade. She searched for meaning and significance in her personal experiences; combining the textual with the visual.

From 1975, she created a critical, feminist methodology to investigate patriarchal representation. As a student of the Hungarian Academy of Fine Arts, and under her birth name, Drozdik Orsolya, she researched and examined 19th and early 20th century academic documents of the female nude-model settings in the archive of the academy's library. She photographed and "appropriated" these photo-images for her concept ImageBank; a semiotic study of patriarchal art history, academic training, -education; an image analysis of appropriated images; projected, manipulated and unmanipulated; these were exhibited: NudeModel (1976-1977), and Individual Mythology (1975-1977). The title Individual Mythology is a reference to Harald Szeemann's "Individual Mythologies" section at the documenta 5, Kassel, 1972 and Joseph Beuys.

Using her own body, she created feminist performance art, photos, drawings, and installations in order to investigate patriarchal representation. Her methodology, her "feminist conceptual art" continued, in Pornography (1978–79), a critical analysis of pornographic representation, and In Someones Shadows (1979), Diverting Diagonal (1979–80), Double (1980), and in I Try to be transparent (to art history) (1980). Later, she amended her methods as critical representations deconstruction of meaning and theories of representation to encompass various fields, mediums and concepts. At the same time, she performed and exhibited photographs offset prints and drawings, address the complexities of political and personal. Exploring the relationship between the visual and the linguistic, thus connecting her concepts as in the Renaissance of the Biblical text, for instance, to images.

In the mid-seventies, rebelling against the educational and political systems, she found her voice. From 1975, she exhibited in Budapest and internationally in socialist countries, and worked in association with "Rozsa" (Roses), a young artists' post-conceptual group (1976–78). In 1978, she married Andreas De Jong, left Hungary, lived in Amsterdam, 1979, divorced and moved to Vancouver, Toronto; then in 1980 to New York City. She lived in Vancouver, Toronto and New York City between 1979 and 1991 with the novelist Patrick McGrath.

1980-1999
In the early 1980s, Drozdik worked in association with the artist group Colab. From 1984, she started to work on her decades long project Adventure in Technos Dystopium; deconstructing 18th and 19th century scientific representation of truth and reality. She photographed the displays in European and American science museums, resulting in the series of photographs titled Dystopium Infinete. Adventure in Technos Dystopium derived Popular Natural Philosophy, (1988), Morbid Condition, (1989), Fragmenta Naturae, (1990), and Cynical Reason (1990-91) referencing the Age of Reason. She exhibited at the Tom Cugliani Gallery (1988-1893), the Richard Anderson Gallery (1990–95), and the New Museum, 1989, 1991,Age and at the 9th Biennale of Sydney in 1992.

In late 90s she exhibited in Hungarian and Central European institutions including the Ernst Museum in Budapest, the Adventure in Technos Dystopium (1990), 3 by 3 from Hungary (1996) at the Center for Curatorial Studies, New York. and The New Arrivals: 8 Contemporary Artists from Hungary, (2011) and at the Palais des Beaux-Arts, Brussels., among others. Her photographic installations of the late 1980s and 1900s are a production of a new Body Space, a project that reflects the video installation of Tony Oursler. In 1983 she produced through the legacy of Andreas Vesalius the drawing series, Dissection of Artaud, Foucalt and Vesalius (1983–84), Drozdik's statement on the link between the dissectional probings of the body and her gender concerns.

2000
In the years of 2000 Drozdik had major retrospective exhibitions showing different aspects of her work: Adventure and Appropriation 1975-2001 were exhibited at the Ludwig Museum in Budapest - Museum of Contemporary Art, Ludwig Museum and Museum of Contemporary Art, Budapest 2001–02, Passion After Appropriation in Museum of Contemporary Art Muzej Suvremene Umjetnosti, Zagreb, and in The Art Pavilion in Zagreb, Croatia, 2002, Individual Mythology - Medical Venus - Young and Beautiful, Municipal Museum of Art, Győr, 2003, The Other Venus, MODEM 2011, Contemporary Art Center. Debrecen, Hungary. In 2006 Drozdik published a book titled Individuális Mitológia, konceptuálistól a postmodernig,  (Individual Mythology From Conceptual to Postmodern Gondolat Publishing IBNS 9639567795) a summary of her thoughts, methodology and work process, focusing on her starting point the 1970s conceptual movements in Hungary.

Work

Drozdik in her work exposes social issues that are embedded within a cultural system, thus countering a range of representations in regards facts and scientific truths within the discourses of art, medical, and scientific history.

Performance
Her works, Individual Mythology (1975–77) and Nude model (1977), comprising performance, photography, offset prints and drawings, were exhibited in Budapest. In this series, she started to deconstruct the representations of female body based on her original concept named Image Bank, in Hungarian Képban elmélet (1975), in which she defined her methodology using existing representations to unfold and reinterpret meaning. Inspired by Valéria Dienes, the philosopher and dancer, she was able to link her female point of view to the early feminist movement, that was powerful in Hungary before WWII. A harbinger in the Eastern Bloc, Drozdik focused on the methodology of representation - using the early 20 century “Free Dancer” movements in Hungary as a starting point - to construct a discourse of feminist art. The Pornography (1978) series was completed in Amsterdam, I Try To Be Transparent (1980), performance and the Double (1980) in Toronto and Genius (1989) New Museum - Digital Archive in New Museum, New York

Photography
Individual Mythology (1975–77), Nude model (1977), Cammon Symbols (1976–77), Blink and Sigh, (1977), Pornography (1978–79), Temporary Coherence (1979–80), Adventure in Technos Dystopium (1984-1996), Manufacturing the Self (1990-96)

Video
Individual Mythology, (1977-2014), Individual Mythology: Play It Again, Drozdik (2014), Double (1980), I try to be transparent (1980),  Genius (1989), My Mother, Erzsébet Kockás's Strudel (1997), Young and Beautiful, Oshi Ohashi: Young and Beautiful, Confident Cosmetic Line (1997),  It's All Over Now Baby Blue (2015),  Stripes à la Sol LeWitt, (painting performance with musical accompaniment by Krisztina Megyeri ‘s composition, Hohes Ufer II (2014)

Installation
Adventure in Technos Dystopium (1984–1993) deconstructed scientific representations of truth. For this series Drozdik created a fictional 18th century female scientist, Edith Simpson. Some of the themes she explored were the romanticizing of disease and the taxonomic formalism of Carl Linnaeus.

From 1989 Drozdik used models of her father's brain as part of a sculptural installations.

In 1988, 1989, and 1990, she exhibited at the Tom Cugliani Gallery.  Drozdik continued to produce and exhibit feminist work, and deconstructing the patriarchal, scientific gaze, including, in 1986, inventing the 18th Century pseudo-persona of Edith Simpson,(1983–88); a woman scientist complete with her own heritage.
Her installation series entitled Manufacturing the Self (1993–97) is a deconstruction of medical representations of the female body. Drozdik's 1993-04 exhibition Medical Erotic, part of the Manufacturing the Self series, featured a cast of the Drozdik's body alongside photographs of a medical wax-work figure and a fictional journal.  The installation Manufacturing The Self, Brains on High Heels (1992), a rubber cast of a brain inserted into a pair of high heels. Exhibited first in Sydney Biennial in 1992–93.

Conceptual painting series
Art history and Me (1982) she created a new series of paintings titled Lipstick Paintings ala Fontana (2002–06) in which the surface of canvases are punctured with lipstick. The series of digital prints Venuses, Drapery and Bodyfolds (2000–2007) featured fragments of draperies and naked women from the history of art. A series of exhibitions titled All Over Now Baby Blue were exhibited from 2013 to 2015, Stripes Ala Sol Levitt in 2015.

Book
Orshi Drozdik: Individuális Mitológia, konceptuálistól a postmodernig, (Individual Mythology From Conceptual to Postmodern), Gondolat Publishing, 2006, Budapest IBNS 9639567795,

Selected works
 1975-76 The line, etching style animation
 1975-77 Nude Model I, II, III,, series of photos and performances
 1975-76 Situation, series of photos
 1975-77 Individual Mythology I, II, III,, series of performances, photos and photo offsets Individuális mitológia
 1976-77 Individual Mythology, Out of Cage, performance and photos, offset
 1977 Blink and Sigh I, II, III,, series of performances and photos
 1976-77 Common symbols, series of photos and photo offsets
 1978-79 Pornography I, II, III,, series of performances, photos, xeroxes
 1979 On My Beauty
 1980 I try To Be Transparent (to art history), performance, photos
 1978-80 In Some One Shadows I, II, series of photos, xeroxes, drawings, installations
 1980 Diverting the Diagonal I, II, series of performances, photos, xeroxes
 1982 Art History and Me
 1983-85 Biological Metaphors
 1984 Biological Metaphors At the Budapest Galeria,
 1984 Adventure in Tecnos Dystopium
 1986 The Life of Edith Simpson, Epitome of the Enlightenment, National Genius of Art and Science. Orshi Drozdik, New York.
 1986 The Hierarchy of Organs
 1987 Love Letter to the Leyden Jar
 1990-91 Cynical Reason I, II, III, installation
 1993-97 Manufacturing the Self: Medical Erotic, 1993, Body Self, 1994, Brains on High Heels, 1992, Nun Self, 1994
 1993-2007 Lipstick Paintings, painting series with lipstick
 2004 My Life as an 18th Century Scientist, installation
 2007 Venuses: Draperies and Folds of the Body
 2009-10 Un Chandelier Maria Theresa, installation
 2011-2012 The Other Venus
 2013 It's All Over Now Baby Blue
 2013 It's All Over Now Baby Blue, paintings, drawings, performance series [24]
 2015 Stripes ala Sol LeWitt, performance, paintings, installation
 2018 CellPaintings, paintings
 2018 Sensuality and Matter, paintings, drawings
 2019 O.D.F.A.M.Orshi Drozdik Feminist Art Museum traveling art museum
 2019-20 Medea Insurrection: Radical Women Artists Behind the Iron Curtain

Awards and membership
 1976 Kondor Béla Award of the Hungarian Academy of Fine Arts, Budapest, Hungary
 1977 Stipend of the Young Artist's Studio, Budapest, Hungary
 1985 Prince Bernhard Foundation fellowship, Amsterdam, The Netherlands
 1990 The Pollock-Krasner Foundation Grant, New York, USA
 1990 The Gordon Matta-Clark Trust fellowship, New York, USA
 1991 Cartier Foundation Fellowship, Paris, France
 1993 The Pollock-Krasner Foundation grant, New York, USA
 1993–95 CAVA, Career Advancement of Visual Artists fellowship, Miami, FL, USA
 1994 Austrian Ministry of Culture fellowship, Vienna, Austria
 1995 New York Foundation for the Arts, Women Photographers Catalog Project, New York, USA
 2001 The Adolph and Esther Gottlieb Foundation scholarship, New York, USA
 2003/04 Landis & Gyr Foundation grant, Zug, Switzerland
 2003 Munkácsy Mihály State Art Award, :hu:Munkácsy-díj Munkacsy Mihaly Hungary
 2015 Széchenyi Academy of Letters and Arts
 Drozdik is member of SZIMA, The Hungarian Academy of Sciences and the Arts

See also

 List of Hungarians
 Feminist theory
 Feminism in culture
 Feminist philosophy
 Conceptual Art
 Body Art
 Feminism

Notes

References

Further reading
Source: Drozdik, Orshi; Korner Eva; Neray, Katalin; Welchman, C. John. Editor, Hegyi, Dora. Orshi Drozdik Adventures & Appropriation 1975-2001, Ludwig Museum Budapest, 2001. Mester Nyomda Press, Budapest. .
 Beeder, William: Of Gears and Flesh, East Village Eye, May 1986
 Smith, Roberta: An Array of Artists, Styles and Trends in Downtown Galleries, New York Times, 26 February 1988
 Indiana, Gary: Science Holiday, The Village Voice, 15 March 1988
 Heartney, Eleanor:  Review in Art in America, June 1988
 Heartney, Eleanor: Strong Debuts, Contemporanea, July/August 1988
 Huntington, Richard: Dystopia Rears its Ugly Head in CEPA Display, Gusto, 2 December 1988
 Haus, Mary Ellen:  Orshi Drozdik: Tom Cugliani Gallery, Tema Celeste, April/May 1988
 Gookin, Kirby: Review in Artforum, May 1989
 Russel, John: A Good Read: The Book as Metaphor: Barbara Toll Gallery, New York Times, 16 June 1989
 Spector, Nancy:  Review in Artscribe, Summer 1989
 Wei, Lilly: The Peripatetic Artist: 14 Statements, Art in America, July 1, 1989
 Veelen van, Ijsbrand: Kunstzinnigdoktertje Spelen,  Het Parol, 25 October 1989
 Reinwald, Chris:  Orshi Drozdik, Bleeding, November 1989
 Niesluchowski, W.G.J.: Orshi Drozdik, Adventure in Technos Dystopium; Popular Natural Philospby, CEPA Journal, vol. 4, issue 1, 1989-1990
 Bán, András: Mental Construction and a Worn-Out Shoe, Magyar Nemzet, September 7, 1990
 Nesweda, Peter: Im Seltsamen Labyrintb der Naturwissenscbaft, Der Stadard, November 6, 1990
 Hoffmann, Donald: Tierra preaches ecology, The Kansas City Star, January 21, 1990
 Levin, Kim: Review in Voice , February 20, 1990
 Otis, Lauren: Review in Glass, Spring-Summer 1990
 Bruyn de, Eric: Orshi Drozdik, Forum, January–February 1990
 Ball, Edward: Orshi Drozdik, Seven Days, 21 February 1990
 Sturcz, János: Beautiful Metaphors, Új Művészet, March 1990
 Mahoney, Robert: Review in Arts, May 1990
 Levy, Ellen: Natural History Re-Created'', Center Quarterly, v. 11, #4, 1990

External links
 Individuális mitológia - Drozdik Orshi performansza 2014.03.19.
 Orshi Drozdik at Knoll Galerie | Exhibition O.D.F.A.M. (Orshi Drozdik Feminist Art Museum)
 ORSHI DROZDIK ORSOLYA SEJTMOZGÁS
 Orshi Drozdik: Installation (Un chandelier Marie Theréze)_Jul 25, 2013
 Drozdik Orsolya interjú_Jul 11, 2019
 DROZDIK ORSOLYA: CSÍKOK_Sep 17, 2015
 Drozdik Orsolya Orshi: Az érzékiség és az anyag_Sep 26, 2018
 Orshi Drozdik Retrospective Exhibition Ludwig Museum Budapest 2001/02

1946 births
Living people
20th-century Hungarian women artists
21st-century Hungarian women artists
20th-century Hungarian painters
21st-century Hungarian painters
20th-century Hungarian sculptors
21st-century Hungarian sculptors
20th-century women photographers
21st-century women photographers
Feminist artists
Hungarian contemporary artists
Hungarian feminists
Hungarian erotic artists
Postmodern artists
Installation artists
Multimedia artists
Hungarian University of Fine Arts alumni
Women conceptual artists
Conceptual artists
Post-conceptual artists